This is a list of properties and districts in Jenkins County, Georgia that are listed on the National Register of Historic Places (NRHP).

`

Current listings

|}

References

Jenkins
Buildings and structures in Jenkins County, Georgia